Anna-Marie Holmes (born April 17, 1942) is a Canadian-born ballet dancer, educator and choreographer. Holmes received an Emmy Award in 2000 for her staging of Le Corsaire for PBS. She was the founder and co-artistic director for the International Academy of Dance Costa do Sol in Portugal.

Early life and education 
She was born to George Ellerbeck and Maxine Botterill, as Anna-Marie Ellerbeck, in Mission City, British Columbia.

Career 
Holmes was a soloist with the Royal Winnipeg Ballet from 1960 to 1962 and a guest performer with the Kirov Ballet during the early 1960s, the first North American dancer invited to perform with them. Holmes has also performed with the London Festival Ballet, the Scottish Ballet, the Berlin State Opera, the Dutch National Ballet, the Chicago Ballet and Les Grands Ballets Canadiens. In 1985, after retiring from performing, she joined the Boston Ballet as ballet mistress and was named that company's artistic director in 1997. She also served as dean of faculty for the Boston Ballet's Center for Dance Education. She left the Boston Ballet in 2001. Holmes received an Emmy Award in 2000 for her staging of Le Corsaire for PBS.

Holmes was founder and co-artistic director for the  International Academy of Dance Costa do Sol in Portugal. She has been artistic director for the school of the USA International Ballet Competition in Jackson, Mississippi. Holmes has also been artistic director for the Jacob's Pillow dance festival. In 2006, she was co-founder of Ballet Adriatico, a summer festival in Italy.

Holmes danced a pas de deux with her husband in Norman McLaren's award-winning film Ballet Adagio. The pair were also featured in Grant Munro's documentary Tour en l'air, which won first prize in its category at the American Film Festival.

Holmes is known for her restagings of classic ballets, particularly those from Russia, such as Swan Lake, Giselle, Don Quixote, The Sleeping Beauty, La Bayadère and The Nutcracker. Various choreographers including Agnes de Mille, Peter Darrell and Ruth Page have created works for her.

Holmes later became co-manager of Editions Anna-Marie Holmes, a publishing house for ballet music.

Personal life 
In 1960, she married dancer David Holmes. The couple had a daughter but later separated.

References 
Holmes has staged Corsaire at ABT, Teatro Colon Argentina, English National Ballet, Hungarian National Ballet, Washington Ballet, Pittsburgh Ballet, La Scala Milan Italy, Hong Kong Ballet, La Bayadere for Antwerp Ballet, and Swan Lake for Norwegian National Ballet. She staged and choreographed Raymonda for the Finnish National Ballet and ABT.

External links 
 

1942 births
Living people
Canadian ballerinas
Canadian female dancers
Canadian choreographers
Canadian women choreographers
Ballet mistresses
Artistic directors
People from Mission, British Columbia
The Royal Conservatory of Music alumni